Killay South was an electoral ward in the City and County of Swansea, Wales.  The ward was mainly rural and consisted of some or all of the following areas: Dunvant, Ilston, Killay, Sketty and Upper Killay in the parliamentary constituency of Swansea West.

It was bounded by the wards of Dunvant and Killay North to the north; Sketty to the east; Mayals to the south; and Fairwood to the west.

For the 2012 local council elections, the turnout for Killay south was 43.73%.  The results were:

Former electoral wards of Swansea